Cheese Cake (subtitled Dexter In Radioland Vol. 2) is a live album by American saxophonist Dexter Gordon recorded at the Jazzhus Montmartre in Copenhagen, Denmark in 1964 by Danmarks Radio and released on the SteepleChase label in 1979.

Critical reception 

AllMusic critic Scott Yanow stated "This particular LP features the great tenor with a rhythm section  Europe's best ... Gordon takes long solos that never seem to run out of ideas, making this set a valuable addition to his lengthy discography".

Track listing 
All compositions by Dexter Gordon except where noted.

 Introduction by Dexter Gordon – 2:20
 "Cheese Cake" – 14:00
 "Manhã de Carnaval" (Luiz Bonfá, Antônio Maria) – 9:30
 "Second Balcony Jump" (Billy Eckstine, Gerald Valentine) – 13:30

Personnel 
Dexter Gordon – tenor saxophone
Tete Montoliu – piano
Niels-Henning Ørsted Pedersen – bass
Alex Riel – drums

References 

SteepleChase Records live albums
Dexter Gordon live albums
1979 live albums
Albums recorded at Jazzhus Montmartre